K. Thavamani Devi (c. 1925 – 10 February 2001) was a Sri Lankan actress who also worked in a number of Tamil films during the 1940s. Born and brought up in a wealthy family in Jaffna, Sri Lanka her father was a successful barrister. Encouraged by parents, Thavamani moved to Madras, India at an early age. She was from Sri Lankan Tamil heritage.

During her time in Madras, she learnt Bharata Natyam and Carnatic music, which helped her sing her own lines in many Tamil films. owing to her singing talents won her the honorific "Ceylon Kuyil". She was MGR's heroine in Rajakumaari (1947). Some of the other films that she did in Tamil include Shakuntala, Vana Mohini, Naatiya Rani, Krishna Kumar and Bhakta Kaalathi

Later Years
She married a widower, Kodilinga Sankara Sastry of Rameshwaram, in November 1962 and retired to a spiritual life.

References

1920s births
2001 deaths
20th-century Sri Lankan actresses
Actresses in Tamil cinema
People from Jaffna
Sri Lankan film actresses
Sri Lankan Tamil women